Frost is a thin layer of ice on a solid surface, which forms from water vapor in an above-freezing atmosphere coming in contact with a solid surface whose temperature is below freezing, and resulting in a phase change from water vapor (a gas) to ice (a solid) as the water vapor reaches the freezing point. In temperate climates, it most commonly appears on surfaces near the ground as fragile white crystals; in cold climates, it occurs in a greater variety of forms. The propagation of crystal formation occurs by the process of nucleation.

The ice crystals of frost form as the result of fractal process development. The depth of frost crystals varies depending on the amount of time they have been accumulating, and the concentration of the water vapor (humidity). Frost crystals may be invisible (black), clear (translucent), or white; if a mass of frost crystals scatters light in all directions, the coating of frost appears white.

Types of frost include crystalline frost (hoar frost or radiation frost) from deposition of water vapor from air of low humidity, white frost in humid conditions, window frost on glass surfaces, advection frost from cold wind over cold surfaces, black frost without visible ice at low temperatures and very low humidity, and rime under supercooled wet conditions.

Plants that have evolved in warmer climates suffer damage when the temperature falls low enough to freeze the water in the cells  that make up the plant tissue. The tissue damage resulting from this process is known as "frost damage". Farmers in those regions where frost damage has been known to affect their crops often invest in substantial means to protect their crops from such damage.

Formation

If a solid surface is chilled below the dew point of the surrounding humid air, and the surface itself is colder than freezing, ice will form on it. If the water deposits as a liquid that then freezes, it forms a coating that may look glassy, opaque, or crystalline, depending on its type. Depending on context, that process may also be called atmospheric icing. The ice it produces differs in some ways from crystalline frost, which consists of spicules of ice that typically project from the solid surface on which they grow.

The main difference between the ice coatings and frost spicules arises because the crystalline spicules grow directly from desublimation of water vapour from air, and desublimation is not a factor in icing of freezing surfaces. For desublimation to proceed, the surface must be below the frost point of the air, meaning that it is sufficiently cold for ice to form without passing through the liquid phase. The air must be humid, but not sufficiently humid to permit the condensation of liquid water, or icing will result instead of desublimation. The size of the crystals depends largely on the temperature, the amount of water vapor available, and how long they have been growing undisturbed.

As a rule, except in conditions where supercooled droplets are present in the air, frost will form only if the deposition surface is colder than the surrounding air. For instance, frost may be observed around cracks in cold wooden sidewalks when humid air escapes from the warmer ground beneath. Other objects on which frost commonly forms are those with low specific heat or high thermal emissivity, such as blackened metals, hence the accumulation of frost on the heads of rusty nails.

The apparently erratic occurrence of frost in adjacent localities is due partly to differences of elevation, the lower areas becoming colder on calm nights. Where static air settles above an area of ground in the absence of wind, the absorptivity and specific heat of the ground strongly influence the temperature that the trapped air attains.

Types

Hoar frost

Hoar frost, also hoarfrost, radiation frost, or pruina, refers to white ice crystals deposited on the ground or loosely attached to exposed objects, such as wires or leaves. They form on cold, clear nights when conditions are such that heat radiates into outer space faster than it can be replaced from nearby warm objects or brought in by the wind. Under suitable circumstances, objects cool to below the frost point of the surrounding air, well below the freezing point of water. Such freezing may be promoted by effects such as flood frost or frost pocket. These occur when ground-level radiation cools air until it flows downhill and accumulates in pockets of very cold air in valleys and hollows. Hoar frost may freeze in such low-lying cold air even when the air temperature a few feet above ground is well above freezing.

The word "hoar" comes from an Old English adjective that means "showing signs of old age". In this context, it refers to the frost that makes trees and bushes look like white hair. 

Hoar frost may have different names depending on where it forms:
Air hoar is a deposit of hoar frost on objects above the surface, such as tree branches, plant stems, and wires.
Surface hoar refers to fern-like ice crystals directly deposited on snow, ice, or already frozen surfaces.
Crevasse hoar consists of crystals that form in glacial crevasses where water vapour can accumulate under calm weather conditions.
Depth hoar refers to faceted crystals that have slowly grown large within cavities beneath the surface of banks of dry snow. Depth hoar crystals grow continuously at the expense of neighbouring smaller crystals, so typically are visibly stepped and have faceted hollows.

When surface hoar covers sloping snowbanks, the layer of frost crystals may create an avalanche risk; when heavy layers of new snow cover the frosty surface, furry crystals standing out from the old snow hold off the falling flakes, forming a layer of voids that prevents the new snow layers from bonding strongly to the old snow beneath. Ideal conditions for hoarfrost to form on snow are cold, clear nights, with very light, cold air currents conveying humidity at the right rate for growth of frost crystals. Wind that is too strong or warm destroys the furry crystals, and thereby may permit a stronger bond between the old and new snow layers. However, if the winds are strong enough and cold enough to lay the crystals flat and dry, carpeting the snow with cold, loose crystals without removing or destroying them or letting them warm up and become sticky, then the frost interface between the snow layers may still present an avalanche danger, because the texture of the frost crystals differs from the snow texture, and the dry crystals will not stick to fresh snow. Such conditions still prevent a strong bond between the snow layers.

In very low temperatures where fluffy surface hoar crystals form without subsequently being covered with snow, strong winds may break them off, forming a dust of ice particles and blowing them over the surface. The ice dust then may form yukimarimo, as has been observed in parts of Antarctica, in a process similar to the formation of dust bunnies and similar structures.

Hoar frost and white frost also occur in man-made environments such as in freezers or industrial cold-storage facilities. If such cold spaces or the pipes serving them are not well insulated and are exposed to ambient humidity, the moisture will freeze instantly depending on the freezer temperature. The frost may coat pipes thickly, partly insulating them, but such inefficient insulation still is a source of heat loss.

Advection frost
Advection frost (also called wind frost) refers to tiny ice spikes that form when very cold wind is blowing over tree branches, poles, and other surfaces. It looks like rimming on the edges of flowers and leaves, and usually forms against the direction of the wind. It can occur at any hour, day or night.

Window frost
Window frost (also called fern frost or ice flowers) forms when a glass pane is exposed to very cold air on the outside and warmer, moderately moist air on the inside. If the pane is a bad insulator (for example, if it is a single-pane window), water vapour condenses on the glass, forming frost patterns. With very low temperatures outside, frost can appear on the bottom of the window even with double-pane energy-efficient windows because the air convection between two panes of glass ensures that the bottom part of the glazing unit is colder than the top part. On unheated motor vehicles, the frost usually forms on the outside surface of the glass first. The glass surface influences the shape of crystals, so imperfections, scratches, or dust can modify the way ice nucleates. The patterns in window frost form a fractal with a fractal dimension greater than one, but less than two. This is a consequence of the nucleation process being constrained to unfold in two dimensions, unlike a snowflake, which is shaped by a similar process, but forms in three dimensions and has a fractal dimension greater than two.

If the indoor air is very humid, rather than moderately so, water first condenses in small droplets, and then freezes into clear ice.

Similar patterns of freezing may occur on other smooth vertical surfaces, but they seldom are as obvious or spectacular as on clear glass.

White frost
White frost is a solid deposition of ice that forms directly from water vapour contained in air.

White frost forms when relative humidity is above 90% and the temperature below −8 °C (18 °F), and it grows against the wind direction, since air arriving from windward has a higher humidity than leeward air, but the wind must not be strong, else it damages the delicate icy structures as they begin to form. White frost resembles a heavy coating of hoar frost with big, interlocking crystals, usually needle-shaped.

Rime

Rime is a type of ice deposition that occurs quickly, often under heavily humid and windy conditions. Technically speaking, it is not a type of frost, since usually supercooled water drops are involved, in contrast to the formation of hoar frost, in which water vapour desublimates slowly and directly. Ships travelling through Arctic seas may accumulate large quantities of rime on the rigging. Unlike hoar frost, which has a feathery appearance, rime generally has an icy, solid appearance.

Black frost

Black frost or ("killing frost") is not strictly speaking frost at all, because it is the condition seen in crops when the humidity is too low for frost to form, but the temperature falls so low that plant tissues freeze and die, becoming blackened, hence the term "black frost". Black frost often is called "killing frost" because white frost tends to be less cold, partly because the latent heat of freezing of the water reduces the temperature drop.

Effect on plants

Damage

Many plants can be damaged or killed by freezing temperatures or frost. This varies with the type of plant, the tissue exposed, and how low temperatures get; a "light frost" of   damages fewer types of plants than a "hard frost" below .

Plants likely to be damaged even by a light frost include vines—such as beans, grapes, squashes, melons—along with nightshades such as tomatoes, eggplants, and peppers. Plants that may tolerate (or even benefit from) frosts include:
root vegetables (e.g. beets, carrots, parsnips, onions)
leafy greens (e.g. lettuces, spinach, chard, cucumber)
cruciferous vegetables (e.g. cabbages, cauliflower, bok choy, broccoli, Brussels sprouts, radishes, kale, collard, mustard, turnips, rutabagas)
Even those plants that tolerate frost may be damaged once temperatures drop even lower (below ). Hardy perennials, such as Hosta, become dormant after the first frosts and regrow when spring arrives. The entire visible plant may turn completely brown until the spring warmth, or may drop all of its leaves and flowers, leaving the stem and stalk only. Evergreen plants, such as pine trees, withstand frost although all or most growth stops. Frost crack is a bark defect caused by a combination of low temperatures and heat from the winter sun.

Vegetation is not necessarily damaged when leaf temperatures drop below the freezing point of their cell contents. However, once frost forms, the leaf cells may be damaged by sharp ice crystals. Hardening is the process by which a plant becomes tolerant to low temperatures. See also Cryobiology.

Bacteria lacking ice nucleation-active proteins (ice-minus bacteria) result in greatly reduced frost damage.

Protection methods

Typical measures to prevent frost or reduce its severity include one or more of:
Deploying powerful blowers to simulate wind, thereby preventing the formation of accumulations of cold air. There are variations on this theme. One variety is the wind machine, an engine-driven propeller mounted on a vertical pole that blows air almost horizontally. Wind machines were introduced as a method for frost protection in California during the 1920s, but they were not widely accepted until the 1940s and 1950s. Now, they are commonly used in many parts of the world. Another is the selective inverted sink, a device which prevents frost by drawing cold air from the ground and blowing it up through a chimney. It was originally developed to prevent frost damage to citrus fruits in Uruguay. In New Zealand, helicopters are used in similar fashion, especially in the vineyard regions such as Marlborough. By dragging down warmer air from the inversion layers, and preventing the ponding of colder air on the ground, the low-flying helicopters prevent damage to the fruit buds. As the operations are conducted at night, and have in the past involved up to 130 aircraft per night in one region, safety rules are strict. Although not a dedicated method, wind turbines have a similar (although smaller) effect of vertically mixing air layers of different temperature.
For high-value crops, farmers may wrap trees and use physical crop coverings.
For high-value crops grown over small areas, heating to slow the drop in temperature may be practical.
Production of smoke to reduce cooling by radiation
Spraying crops with a layer of water releases latent heat, preventing harmful freezing of the tissues of the plants that it coats.
Such measures need to be applied with discretion, because they may do more harm than good; for example, spraying crops with water can cause damage if the plants become overburdened with ice. An effective, low cost method for small crop farms and plant nurseries, exploits the latent heat of freezing. If the water freezes, it gives off its latent heat, preventing the temperature of the foliage from falling much below zero.

Frost-free areas
Some areas on the oceanic margins of the subtropics are also frost-free, as are highly oceanic areas near windward coasts. The most poleward frost-free areas are the lower altitudes of the Azores, Île Amsterdam, Île Saint-Paul, and Tristan da Cunha.

In the contiguous United States, southern Florida around Miami Beach and the Florida Keys are the only reliably frost-free areas, as well as the Channel Islands off the coast of California. The hardiness zones in these regions are 11a and 11b.

Personifications

Frost is personified in Russian culture as Ded Moroz. Indigenous peoples of Russia such as the Mordvins have their own traditions of frost deities.

English folklore tradition holds that Jack Frost, an elfish creature, is responsible for feathery patterns of frost found on windows on cold mornings.

Gallery

See also
Black ice
Frost (temperature)
Frost heaving
Frost line
Frostbite
Ground frost
Icing (nautical)
Needle ice

References

External links

Guide to Frost
How much do you know about frost? – BBC
American Meteorological Society, Glossary of Meteorology – Hoarfrost
The Weather Doctor – Weather Whys – Frost

Frost and rime
Psychrometrics
Water ice